The Greater Sydney Commission is an independent New South Wales Government agency responsible for land use planning across the metropolitan area of Sydney, Australia. The Commission was led by  Lucy Turnbull as chief commissioner from 2015 until her resignation in March 2020. Geoff Roberts, previously the deputy chief commissioner, was appointed to fill the role from April 2020 to March 2021.

References

External links 
Greater Sydney Commission website

Government agencies of New South Wales
Land management in Australia
Agriculture in New South Wales